Josemania delicatula, synonym Cipuropsis delicatula, is a species in the family Bromeliaceae, native to Colombia.

References

Tillandsioideae
Flora of Colombia